666 was a German DJ act, formed by Thomas Detert and Mike Griesheimer in 1997. They produced a mix of electronic music and often included lyrics in Spanish and English. The act disbanded in 2005.

Discography

Albums

Singles

References

External links
 Discogs.com 666 Band Information

German house music groups
German electronic music groups
ZYX Music artists